Montenegro sent a delegation to compete at the 2008 Summer Paralympics in Beijing, People's Republic of China.

Swimming 

Men

See also
Montenegro at the Paralympics
Montenegro at the 2008 Summer Olympics

External links
International Paralympic Committee

Nations at the 2008 Summer Paralympics
2008
Summer Paralympics